Erbi Ago (born 8 March 1990) is an Albanian entrepreneur, legal professional, actor, and academic. 

Ago was born in Tirana, Albania. Leaving home at the age of 15, he has lived in Bulgaria and the United Kingdom. He was first discovered in Sofia, Bulgaria. He is part of the cast of American film Messengers 2: The Scarecrow, starring Norman Reedus and Claire Holt, playing the role of Randy. He is known for the role of Stuart in Ghost Town (2009), and John Fields in Lightning Strikes (2009).  As of 2014, he has become an academic and lecturer of Business Law at Tirana Business University.

Early life 
,Ago was born on March 8, 1990, in Tirana, Albania during the last year of its communist regime. He was the first of two children and only son of Petrit Ago, a businessman and taxation director. His mother is a homemaker and commodity analyst. His father was born in Tirana and is a public business figure. His mother was born in Belgrade to Dhimiter Stamo, an Albanian Ambassador.

Filmography 
 Messengers 2: The Scarecrow (2009)
 Ghost Town (2009)
 Lightning Strikes (2009)
 Arctic Predator (2010)

References

External links
 

1990 births
Living people
Albanian male film actors
Albanian male models
21st-century Albanian male actors
21st-century Albanian models
People from Tirana